This list comprises all players who have been placed on a regular-season roster for Saint Louis Athletica since the team's first Women's Professional Soccer season in 2009.  This list does not include pre-season training rosters, short term players, or discovery players who do not appear for the club.

All-time Saint Louis Athletica statistics

Regular season statistics

Playoff statistics

Key to positions

Roster History

Initial Allocation
During September and October 2008, Saint Louis began building its team, getting Hope Solo, Lori Chalupny and Tina Ellertson through the 2008 USWNT Allocation, rights to Brazilians Daniela and Renata Costa, Swedish striker Lotta Schelin, Canadian Melissa Tancredi, Eniola Aluko of England, and Ingvild Stensland of Norway through the 2008 WPS International Draft, and India Trotter, Angie Woznuk, Joanna Lohman and Amanda Cinalli through the 2008 WPS General Draft.

It turned out Saint Louis did not have a very successful draft, as Athletica ultimately failed to sign any of Stensland, Schlien, Trotter, and Renata Costa.  Swede Sara Larsson and Brazilian Francielle joined the roster in their steads.

On January 16, at the 2009 NSCAA convention held in St. Louis, the Athletica drafted Notre Dame forward Kerri Hanks, (first round, sixth overall,) Boston College alumnus Kia McNeill, (second round, ninth overall,) Texas defender Stephanie Logterman, (third round, twentieth overall,) Notre Dame defender Elise Weber, (trade* with Washington to be twenty-first,) UConn defender Niki Cross, (fifth round, thirty-fourth,) Villanova goalkeeper Jillian Loyden, (sixth round, thirty-seventh,) West Virginia University midfielder Lisa Stoia, (seventh round, forty-eighth,) Florida forward Megan Kerns, (eighth round, fifty-first,) Penn State defender/midfielder Sheree Gray, (ninth round, sixty-second,) and Clemson midfielder/forward Lydia Vandenbergh (tenth round, sixty-fifth). *The Athletica traded away Joanna Lohman and their 23rd overall pick to get the 21st pick.

On March 3, Athletica's initial preseason roster was released, along with those of all WPS teams, having 35 players listed.  On March 12, Athletica released nine of those players, including draftee Megan Kerns.  Post-Dispatch writer Tom Timmermann posted a slightly short list (down to twenty-four players) on March 16.

2009 In-season Transactions
In the first trade in WPS, Athletica gave the Los Angeles Sol two draft picks in exchange for Christie Welsh and Kendall Fletcher while Lydia Vandenbergh was waived.

In a move to trim the roster back down to regular size, Athletica traded  Kerri Hanks, Francielle, and rights to Renata Costa to Sky Blue FC for Sarah Walsh, rights to Ester, and a conditional draft pick on June 26.

2009-10 Offseason
In the first WPS expansion draft, Athletica lost Amanda Cinalli and Sara Larsson to the Atlanta Beat.  Niki Cross was picked up as a free agent by FC Gold Pride.  Athletica later picked up Elaine and Madelaine Edlund.

Current roster

References

Saint Louis Athletica
 
Saint Louis Athletica
Association football player non-biographical articles
Missouri sports-related lists
Lists of American sportswomen